The Negros Occidental Eco-Tourism Highway, officially known as the Bacolod–San Carlos Road and Bacolod–Murcia–Don Salvador Benedicto–San Carlos Road, is an  scenic highway that connects the city of Bacolod to the city of San Carlos. The Alijis Road (N69) has a two-way bike lane.

The entire highway is designated as National Route 69 (N69) of the Philippine highway network.

Assigned 
This road is assigned as N69 by the DPWH.

Route description

Bacolod to Murcia

Don Salvador Benedicto to San Carlos

Intersections

References 

Roads in Negros Occidental